Juraj or Đurađ Radivojević (died after 1408) was a Bosnian nobleman. He was knez (lord) in Krajina Makareka, serving Queen Helen (r. 1395–1398). He was a son of Radivoje, a member of the Vukčić noble family, which served the Kingdom of Bosnia in Zahumlje.

He married Vladava, the daughter of King Dabiša and Queen Helen's daughter Stana.

References

Medieval Bosnian nobility
Kingdom of Bosnia
14th-century births
15th-century deaths
Grand Knyazs of Bosnia